Kra Buri is the northernmost district (amphoe) of Ranong province, southern Thailand.

History
Mueang Tra (or Kra) was established during the Ayutthaya Kingdom as a fourth class city under Chumphon. The first governor was Mr. Kaew, a cousin of the governor of Nakhon Si Thammarat. Later he was promoted to be Phra Kaew Korop (พระแก้วโกรพ). Mueang Tra was set to be a frontier town of Ayutthaya. The old town center was in Tambon (subdistrict) Pak Chan. In 1884 Phra Atsadongkhotthitraksa (พระอัษฎงคตทิศรักษา) moved it to Tambon Nam Chuet as being better commercially and strategically.

Mueang Tra faced attacks by the Burmese two times, in 1764 during the reign of King Ekkathat and in 1786 in the reign of King Rama I of Rattanakosin. During World War II Japanese troops set Tra as their western division location, and built a railway from Kra Buri via La-un to Mueang Ranong.

Kra Buri was downgraded to a district of Ranong Province around 1896. Around this time, Prince Damrong noted that the area was full of Chinese workers who worked in the tin mine.

Geography
Neighboring districts are (from the northeast clockwise) are: Tha Sae, Mueang Chumphon, and Sawi of Chumphon province; La-un of Ranong Province. To the west is the Tanintharyi Division of Myanmar.

The important water resource is the Kraburi River. Its long estuary is protected as a Ramsar wetland.

Kra Buri lies between the Tenasserim Range and the Kraburi River, about 65 km (40 mi) from Chumphon Province and 58 km (36 mi) from Mueang Ranong.

Administration
The district is divided into seven sub-districts (tambons), which are further subdivided into 60 villages (mubans). Nam Chuet is a township (thesaban tambon) and covers parts of the tambon Nam Chuet. There are seven tambon administrative organizations (TAO) responsible for non-municipal areas.

Products

Ban Tub Lee in Mamu Subdistrict is the origin of Salapao Tub Lee, a Thai bun which is famous and has franchises spread all over the country.

See also
 Tan Kim Ching

References

External links
 

Districts of Ranong province